Ceefax (punning on "seeing facts") was the world's first teletext information service and a forerunner to the current BBC Red Button service. Ceefax was started by the BBC in 1974 and ended, after 38 years of broadcasting, at 23:32:19 BST (11:32 PM BST) on 23 October 2012, in line with the digital switchover being completed in Northern Ireland.

To receive a desired page of text on a teletext-capable receiver, the user would enter a three-digit page number on the device. Once the page number was entered, the selected page would display on the user's screen upon its actual transmission, which would have required a wait of several seconds. There were many pages to choose from and they could be displayed either on a black background or superimposed over the broadcast programme picture. This latter feature made it technically possible for the first time for British broadcasters to transmit subtitles which could be turned on or off by the viewer, rather than as part of the broadcast image.

History

Early electro-mechanical system

During the late 1960s, engineers Geoff Larkby and Barry Pyatt, at the Designs Department (Television Group) of the BBC, worked on an experimental analogue text transmission system. Its object was to transmit a printable page of text during the nocturnal "close-down" period of normal television transmission. Sir Hugh Carleton Greene, then Director General of the BBC, was interested in making farming and stock-market prices available as hard copy via the dormant TV transmitters. The remit received by BBC Designs Department was "the equivalent of one page of The Times newspaper to be transmitted during shut-down".

Their system employed a modified, Alexander Muirhead designed, rotating drum, facsimile transmitter, and Larkby & Pyatt's own, unique, design of hard-copy printer. This printer used pressure-sensitive "till-roll" paper passing over a drum with a raised helix of steel wire.

The drum was synchronised with the transmission drum by means of the "Start of Page", and "Start of Line" information inherent in the Muirhead system. Printing was effected by a hardened steel blade driven by, initially, a loudspeaker-type moving coil, then by a printed-circuit coil, and finally by a special ceramic piezo element manufactured by Brush-Clevite. The combination of rotating helix and oscillating moving blade, with the till-roll paper moving linearly between them, enabled a raster to be drawn on the paper.

Fully-electronic version

The idea was later taken up again, this time in digital and on-screen form, under the new name of CEEFAX, and the new system was announced in October 1972, and following test transmissions in 1972–74, the Ceefax system went live on 23 September 1974 with thirty pages of information. Created in the United Kingdom in the early 1970s by the Philips Lead Designer for VDUs John Adams, his design was given to the BBC so they could start transmission. BBC were working on ways of providing televisual subtitles for deaf people, it was the first teletext system in the world. James Redmond, the BBC's Director of Engineering at the time, was a particular enthusiast. Other broadcasters soon took up the idea, including the Independent Broadcasting Authority (IBA), who had developed the incompatible ORACLE teletext system, at around the same time. Before the Internet and the World Wide Web become popular, Ceefax pages were often the first location to report a breaking story or headline.

After technical negotiations, the two broadcasters settled in 1974 on a single standard, different from both Ceefax and ORACLE, which ultimately developed into World System Teletext (1976), and which remained in use for analogue broadcasts until 2012. The display format of 24 rows by 40 columns of characters was also adopted for the Prestel system.

The technology became the standard European teletext system and replaced other standards, including the Antiope system formerly used in France.

In 1983, Ceefax started to broadcast computer programs, known as telesoftware, for the BBC Micro (a home computer available in the United Kingdom). The telesoftware broadcasts stopped in 1989. A similar idea was the French C Plus Direct satellite channel which used different, higher speed technology to broadcast PC software.

The basic technology of Ceefax remained compatible with the 1976 unified rollout; system elaborations in later years were made such that earlier receivers were still able to do a basic decode of pages, but would simply ignore enhanced information rather than showing corrupted data.

Closure

Until 2012, the BBC's Ceefax service was still providing information on topics covering News, Sport, Weather, TV Listings and Businesses. The pages were kept up to date until the UK digital switchover was completed on Tuesday 23 October 2012.

In 2002, the BBC stopped broadcasting Ceefax on the digital satellite Sky Digital service, but later brought back a limited service, including a TV schedule for BBC One and BBC Two; and subtitles.

The BBC has tried to reuse the old Ceefax page numbers where possible on the Freeview and digital satellite BBC Red Button Ceefax-replacement services.

It was announced that Ceefax would not be replaced when the analogue signal was switched off in October 2012. The BBC Red Button service was seen as an alternative to Ceefax and since 2007 the number of regions with a Ceefax supported analogue signal had declined as digital switchover progressed across the UK. As of the end of 2011, three-quarters of the UK TV regions had completed or were in the process of being switched over.

Ceefax was the last remaining text service available via analogue TV transmissions in the UK, as ITV and Channel 4's Teletext service closed in December 2009. Channel 5's "Five Text" ancillary service closed in 2011. A limited analogue teletext service through ITV and Channel 4 was still available through terrestrial until the digital switchover was completed on 23 October 2012.

At 23:32:19 BST on 23 October 2012, Ceefax was switched off after 38 years of providing news, weather and sport information when the Olympic Games champion Dame Mary Peters turned off the last analogue TV signal in Northern Ireland. A series of graphics on Ceefax's front page marked its 38 years on the BBC. BBC News' website also has memories of Ceefax.

In a tongue-in-cheek article on the 2017 general election, The Guardian gave political satirist Lord Buckethead a "Best Policy" award for the latter's manifesto pledge to bring back Ceefax.

BBC Red Button service

The analogue switch-off in the UK saw the closure of Ceefax in October 2012. Its replacement, BBC Red Button, is available on most digital services including Freeview, Virgin Media, Sky and Freesat. BBC Red Button is accessed by pressing the red button or the text button on any BBC channel. As well as being able to display plain text, BBC Red Button offers richer graphics than Ceefax and a number of interactive video streams. Pages can be navigated to by scrolling with the remote or entering the correct page number; most of the page numbers previously used on Ceefax are the same on BBC Red Button, such as sports being on page number 301 with football on 302 and football results on 316. The new BBC Red Button Service is used as much as Ceefax and is especially popular among football fans.

In September 2019, the BBC announced that the Red Button service would be discontinued in 2020, ending 45 years of text content delivery via TV broadcast.

However, on 29 January 2020, one day before the scheduled date of shutdown, the BBC suspended its decision, pending a review into it, after there were protests concerning certain demographics of people – for example, the elderly – with regards to what impact the removal of the service would have on them.

The BBC Red Button service is currently used in all BBC TV and BBC Radio Channels:

BBC One 
BBC Two 
BBC Three 
BBC Four
CBBC
CBeebies
BBC News
BBC Parliament
BBC Radio 1
BBC R1X
BBC Radio 2
BBC Radio 3
BBC Radio 4
BBC Radio 5L
BBC Radio 5SX
BBC Radio 6 Music
BBC Radio 4 Extra
BBC Asian Network
BBC World Service

Technology
The Ceefax/ORACLE standard was internationalised in the 1980s as World System Teletext, which was adopted into the international standard CCIR 653 (now ITU-R BT.653) of 1986 as CCIR Teletext System B. As with other teletext systems, text and simple graphics are transmitted in-band with the picture signal, and decoded by controller circuitry.

Pages and content
Pages were retrieved using a three-digit number.  From the 1996 relaunch onwards, the main sections were organised as follows:

100s – News
200s – Business News
300s – Sport
400s – Weather and Travel
500s – Entertainment (including 555 – National Lottery results and 570 – Newsround)
600s – TV and Radio Listings
888 – Subtitles

Pages from Ceefax

Pages from Ceefax was a selection of content from the Ceefax service and normally only shown in the absence of any other programming. It consisted of selected Ceefax pages which were transmitted as an ordinary TV picture which was viewable on any receiver. Audio accompaniment consisted of stock music or sometimes a discontinuous tone.

The limited set of rolling pages shown on Pages from Ceefax had been accessible at any time of day on teletext-equipped televisions on page 198 (BBC1) and 298 (BBC2), moving to page 196 in November 1992 and to page 152 in November 1996.

Content
Initially the in-vision broadcasts featured a variety of different topics - news, sport, weather and BBC TV listings. Other topics would be included from time to time, such as financial news, travel news, a recipe and information about the BBC. In late 1989 the Ceefax service was relaunched as a news-focused service and the in-vision sequence became a news only service plus a weather forecast. A headline page for business, sport and travel reappeared in 1992.

In-vision history
In-vision Ceefax was first shown in March 1980, originally in 30-minute slots and by 1983 it was a common filler during daytime downtime. Transmissions were originally billed on-air as Ceefax in Vision but daytime transmissions were not listed in the Radio Times until 7 January 1984, under the title of Pages from Ceefax.

On 28 February 1983, BBC1 started to air a selection of Ceefax pages every weekday morning at 6.00am called Ceefax AM which would lead into the start of Breakfast Time at 6.30am. It is first mentioned in the Radio Times on 21 March.

From May 1983, BBC1 would transmit Ceefax pages during their weekday daytime hours, as BBC1 did not have a codified daytime schedule at that time. This situation continued until Friday 24 October 1986, three days before BBC1 launched a full daytime schedule, resulting in the only Ceefax transmission on BBC1 being the weekday 6.00am Ceefax AM broadcast.

On BBC2 from 19 September 1983, a selection of Ceefax pages would air for a large part of their broadcast day, especially when schools programmes were not on the air, and on many occasions until September 1986, Pages from Ceefax would air continuously from 9.00am until the start of regular programming at around 5.30pm.

From the late 1980s onwards, Pages from Ceefax was increasingly marginalised by the BBC's move towards a near-continuous service and by the start of the 1990s they were shown for short periods, usually for around 15 minutes, before the first programme of the day. However, when the BBC launched The Learning Zone in 1995, it was shown during overnight downtime on BBC Two although latterly BBC News filled many of the late-night/early morning gaps in the schedules.

The last Pages from Ceefax broadcast on BBC1 was on 9 November 1997 but they continued to be broadcast on BBC2 until the Ceefax service was closed down. The final transmission was in the early hours of Monday 22 October 2012 and featured special continuity announcements and a specially created end caption featuring various Ceefax graphics from over the years. The music chosen for the final minutes was "BART" by Ruby, which had been frequently used for Pages from Ceefax and for other continuity. Since then, overnight downtime has been filled with a rolling loop of previews of forthcoming BBC Two programmes.

Similar services on other channels
Channel 4 showed pages from Oracle from 1983 until 1989 and 4-Tel On View from 1983 until 1997, and in the late 1980s and early 1990s, some ITV companies broadcast Jobfinder, which consisted of Teletext pages showing job vacancies and related information. ITV Nightscreen also used Teletext pages in its first few years on air. In its early days, Sky One showed in-vision pages from the Skytext service during its overnight downtime.

Teefax
Teefax is a revamped version of Ceefax for the Raspberry Pi computer introduced in August 2016 by Peter Kwan. To view Teefax, enthusiasts connect a Raspberry Pi running appropriate software to the signal input of a Teletext-capable TV. Kwan said: "It's like the modern-day equivalent of restoring steam engines. It's completely useless but it keeps us occupied." The service has 12 pages of up-to-date news and Kwan hopes to create an online archive of old teletext pages from Britain, Germany and France.

See also

Timeline of teletext in the UK
Timeline of in vision teletext broadcasts in the UK

References

External links

 BBC Ceefax at BBC Online
 Last day of Ceefax
 BBC News article celebrating 30th anniversary of Ceefax
 Online representation of Ceefax as it looked in November 2009

1973 establishments in the United Kingdom
1974 in British television
2012 disestablishments in the United Kingdom
BBC Television
Teletext